Oak Hall is a historic residential estate located on Louisiana Highway 29,  about  south of Bunkie in Avoyelles Parish, Louisiana. The historic property comprises five Arts and Crafts-style buildings:  a main house, a "Delco house", a servant's house, a gazebo with arbor, and a garage. It also includes a bridge.

New Orleans architect E. Burke Mason is credited with design for 1923 renovations.

The house was added to the National Register of Historic Places in 1986.

References

See also
National Register of Historic Places listings in Avoyelles Parish, Louisiana

Houses on the National Register of Historic Places in Louisiana
Houses completed in 1923
Avoyelles Parish, Louisiana